Madyen El Jaouhari (born 16 March 1999) is a French professional footballer who plays as an attacking midfielder for Annecy.

Career
El Jaouhari is a youth product of the academies of AS Saint Genis and Thonon Evian. He moved to Nancy in 2017 and played for their reserves until 2019. He transferred to Annecy in the summer of 2019 originally playing with their reserves, before moving to their senior team in 2021. He helped them come in second at the 2021-22 Championnat National season and promote into the Ligue 2. He debuted with Annecy in a 2–1 loss in the Ligue 2 to Niort on 30 July 2022.

Personal life
Born in France, El Jaouhari is of Moroccan descent.

References

External links
 
 

1999 births
Living people
Sportspeople from Ain
French footballers
French sportspeople of Moroccan descent
AS Nancy Lorraine players
FC Annecy players
Ligue 2 players
Championnat National players
Championnat National 3 players
Association football midfielders